Kalaripayattu (also known simply as Kalari) is an Indian martial art that originated in modern-day Kerala, a state on the southwestern coast of India. Kalaripayattu is known for its long-standing history within Indian martial arts, and is one of the oldest surviving martial arts in India.

Kalaripayattu is mentioned in the Vadakkan Pattukal, a collection of ballads written about the Chekavar of the Malabar region of Kerala. In the Vadakkan Pattukal, it is stated that the cardinal principle of Kalaripayattu was that knowledge of the art be used to further worthy causes, and not for the advancement of one's own selfish interests. Kalaripayattu is a martial art designed for the ancient battlefield (the word "Kalari" meaning "battlefield"), with weapons and combative techniques that are unique to Kerala.

Like most Indian martial arts, Kalaripayattu contains rituals and philosophies inspired by Hinduism. The art also bases medical treatments upon concepts found in the ancient Indian medical text, the Ayurveda. Practitioners of Kalaripayattu possess intricate knowledge of pressure points on the human body and healing techniques that incorporate the knowledge of Ayurveda and Yoga. Kalaripayattu is taught in accordance with the Indian guru-shishya system. Kalaripayattu differs from many other martial arts systems in the world in that weapon based techniques are taught first, and barehanded techniques are taught last.

Elements from the yoga tradition as well as finger movements in the nata dances, were incorporated into Kalaripayattu. A number of South Asian fighting styles remain closely connected to yoga, dance and performing arts. Some of the choreographed sparring in Kalaripayattu can be applied to dance and Kathakali dancers who knew Kalaripayattu were believed to be markedly better than other performers. Some traditional Indian classical dance schools still incorporate martial arts as part of their exercise regimen.

Kalaripayattu includes strikes, kicks, grappling, preset forms, weaponry and healing methods. Warriors trained in Kalaripayattu would use very light, and basic body armor, as it was difficult to maintain flexibility and mobility while in heavy armor.

Unlike in other parts of India, warriors in Kerala belonged to all castes and religions. Women in Keralite society also underwent training in Kalaripayattu, and still do so to this day. Keralite women such as Unniyarcha are mentioned in a collection of ballads from Kerala called the Vadakkan Pattukal, and are praised for their martial prowess.

Etymology 

The word Kalaripayattu is a combination of two Malayalam words - kalari (training ground or battleground) and payattu (training of martial arts), which is roughly translated as “practice in the arts of the battlefield.”

Legend
According to legend, Parashurama is believed to have learned the art from Shiva, and taught it to the original settlers of Kerala shortly after bringing Kerala up from the ocean floor. A song in Malayalam refers to Parashurama's creation of Kerala, and credits him with the establishment of the first 108 kalaris throughout Kerala, along with the instruction of the first 21 Kalaripayattu gurus in Kerala on the destruction of enemies.

History

Early history 

The combat techniques of the Sangam period (600 BCE - 300 CE) were the earliest precursors to Kalaripayattu. 
Each warrior in the Sangam era received regular military training in target practice, horse and elephant riding. They specialized in one or more of the important weapons of the period including the spear (vel), sword (val), shield (kedaham), and bow and arrow (vil ambu). 

Other theories postulate that certain tribal groups inhabiting ancient Kerala founded Kalaripayattu in order to defend themselves against threats from similar groups.

Medieval history 
According to historian A. Sreedharan Menon, Kalaripayattu was among the most important aspects of feudal Keralite society, as it helped impart military training and Spartan-like discipline amongst the youth of Kerala, irrespective of caste, community or sex. Each village in medieval Kerala had its own kalari, which contained a presiding deity known as Bhagavathy or Paradevata. Children in Kerala who finished their normal academic studies in local schools would join their local kalari to receive further military training. This was especially common amongst martial sects of various communities in Kerala, such as the Nairs and Thiyyas. Duarte Barbosa, a Portuguese explorer who visited Kerala in the 16th century, wrote about Nair military training in Kalaripayattu, and stated:

 The more part of Nayars (Nairs), when they are seven years of age, are sent to schools, where they are taught many tricks of nimbleness and dexterity; there they teach them to dance and turn about and to twist on the ground, to take royal leaps and other leaps and this they learn twice a day as long as they are children and they become so loose jointed and supple and they make them turn their bodies contrary to nature; and when they are fully accomplished in this, they teach them to play with the weapon they are most inclined, some play with bows and arrows, some with poles to become spearmen, but most with swords and are ever practising. The Nayars (Nairs) are bound, however old they may be, to always go (for training) in the winter (the rainy season or monsoon season) to take their fencing lessons until they die. - Duarte Barbosa, 16th century Portuguese explorer

Barbosa also noted that the physical exercise complexes of Nairs and Thiyyas, created a network of martial culture in Malabar from the medieval times.Edgar Thurston has written in Castes and Tribes of Southern India about the attacking style of sword called Urumi which is unique to Kalaripayattu,which was extensively used during medieval period, he has written :

 The Tiyans (Thiyyar) were further allowed to wear gold jewels on the neck, to don silken cloths, to fasten a sword round the waist, and to carry a shield. The sword was made of thin pliable steel, and worn round the waist like a belt, the point being fastened to the hilt through a small hole near the point. A man, intending to damage another, might make an apparently friendly call on him, his'body loosely covered with a cloth, and to all appearances unarmed. In less than a second, he could unfasten the sword round his waist, and cut the other down.

Medieval Kerala, according to Menon, was the "golden age" for Kalaripayattu in Kerala, culminating with the writing of the Vadakkan Pattukkal and the establishment of heroes and heroines in Kerala's folklore, such as Aromal Chekavar, Unniyarcha, and Thacholi Othenan, who were celebrated for their martial prowess, chivalry and idealism.

In this period, Kalaripayattu also saw extensive usage in the Keralite practice of ankam ("combat" or "battle" in Malayalam) in settling disputes. Ankam was a form of battle or combat which was commonly used in feudal Kerala as a way to settle disputes that could not be settled by local governmental assemblies. A variant of ankam, called poithu was also practiced, and was a duel between two individuals. Combatants participating in ankam or poithu used Kalaripayattu, and the combatants were given up to 12 years to prepare and train prior to the ankam itself, so that all combatants could achieve the highest level of proficiency with Kalaripayattu's traditional weaponry. In some cases, professional mercenaries trained in Kalaripayattu were paid to engage in ankam on the behalf of others.

The widespread practice and prevalence of Kalaripayattu in Kerala began to decline in the 17th century, when the usage of guns and cannons became widespread. This also coincided with the European invasions into Kerala, after which, firearms began to surpass the usage of traditional weaponry such as swords and spears.

Modern practice 
In 1804, the British banned Kalaripayattu in Kerala in response to the Kottayathu War, a rebellion against British rule in Kerala led by the Keralite king Pazhassi Raja. The ban came into effect shortly after Pazhassi Raja's death on November 30, 1805, resulting in the closure of most of the major kalari training grounds in Kerala. Following the ban, many Keralite gurukkals of Kalaripayattu resisted the ban and continued to teach Kalaripayattu to their students in secret. Gurukkals such as Kottakkal Kanaran Gurukkal, Kovilkandi Kelu Kurup Gurukkal and Maroli Ramunni Gurukkal, learned and preserved the martial art for posterity and were responsible for preserving Kalaripayattu into the beginning of the twentieth century, as well as sparking the revival of Kalaripayattu in Kerala in the 1920s.

The resurgence of public interest in Kalaripayattu began in the 1920s in Thalassery, as part of a wave of rediscovery of the traditional arts throughout southern India and continued through the 1970s surge of general worldwide interest in martial arts.

During this period of renewed public interest in Kerala's native martial art, Kalaripayattu gurukkals such as Chambadan Veetil Narayanan Nair, and Chirakkal T. Sreedharan Nair rose to prominence as the primary gurukkals who preserved and transmitted the martial during the twentieth century and into the modern era. Chambadan Veetil Narayanan Nair, a student of Kottakkal Kanaran Gurukkal, and in whose memory the CVN Kalaris are named, opened several kalaris, and began to spread Kalaripayattu across its native state of Kerala, revitalizing the art across the state in the twentieth century.

Chirakkal T. Sreedharan Nair is also widely credited for reviving and preserving Kalaripayattu by writing the first books ever written on Kalaripayattu, as well as writing the first authoritative text on the martial art. Sreedharan Nair is credited with writing Kalaripayattu, the first book ever written on Kalaripayattu, in 1937. This book was written in Malayalam, and listed the vaithari or oral commands, of all the exercises relating to meypayattu, or conditioning techniques. He is also credited with writing the first authoritative text and primer on Kalaripayattu, called Kalarippayattu – A Complete Guide to Kerala’s Ancient Martial Art. The text, alongside a compilation of Sreedharan Nair's teaching notes, were translated into English by his sons S.R.A. Das and S.R.D. Prasad and then published by Westland Books. The book contains over 1,700 action photographs as well as explanations behind all of the exercises. It continues to be the most authentic reference material on Kalaripayattu to this day.

In the modern era, Kalaripayattu is also used by practitioners of Keralite dance styles, such as Kathakali and Mohiniyattam, as part of their training regimens. Recently, dancers from other, non-Keralite dance forms have also begun to incorporate Kalaripayattu into their training regimes, such as Vasundhara Doraswamy, a well known Bharatanatyam dancer.

In 2017, a 73 year old gurukkal from Vadakara, Sri Meenakshi Amma, was awarded the Padma Sri by the Government of India for her contributions to the preservation of Kalaripayattu.

In January 2021, the Government of Kerala announced the opening of The Kalaripayattu Academy in Kerala's capital, Thiruvananthapuram, under the management of the Kerala Department of Tourism. The Kalaripayattu Academy will comprise an area of 3,500 feet, and will be part of the Vellar Crafts Village. The Kalaripayattu classes will be taught by a group of gurukkals from Kerala, led by Sri Meenakshi Amma, a Kalaripayattu gurukkal and Padma Sri recipient. The Kalaripayattu Academy will initially teach 100 students, both adults and children, in both morning and evening classes. Chief Minister Pinarayi Vijayan is set to announce the syllabus of the academy in 2021.

Practice 

Traditions and methods of teaching of Kalaripayattu varied between different regions of Kerala. Kalaripayattu is taught in a specialized training ground known as a kalari. The location and construction of each kalari is built in accordance to Hindu architectural treatises such as the Vastu Shastras along with various religious traditions and customs native to Kerala. Specifications are made regarding the physical dimensions of the kalari, how deep the ground in a kalari must be, along with the material that the floor of the kalari must consist of. The floor of each kalari consists of red sand which is mixed with specific herbs that are said to aid in the treatment of small wounds suffered during training. The directional aspects of kalari construction are also specified, such as the entrance of the kalari facing east, and the location of ritualistic structures such as the Poothara, Ganapatithara, and Guruthara, are to face the west. The Poothara ("Flower ground" or "Flower floor" in Malayalam) in a kalari is a seven-step raised platform with a lotus-shaped kumbha or figure, at its apex. The seven steps represent the seven dhatu and the kosha of the human body as per Ayurvedic traditions. The kumbha at the apex of the poothara is said to represent Bhagavathy or the heart of the individual. The Ganapatithara ("Ground of Ganapati" in Malayalam) is the area of the kalari that is reserved for the worship of Ganapati, a Hindu deity that is said to be the remover of obstacles. The Guruthara ("Ground of the Guru" in Malayalam) is the area of the kalari that is reserved for worship of the Guru of the kalari, who represents the tradition of gurukkals in Kerala who protected and taught Kalaripayattu to the next generation. In the Ganapatithara, Ganapati is symbolically invoked by the placing of an otta, or tusk-shaped wooden stick. The paduka, or footwear, is placed at the Guruthara to symbolize the life of a gurukkal.  The presiding deity of Kalaripayattu is said to be Bhadrakali or Bhagavathy. Before every training session in the kalari, salutations are provides to the presiding deities and obedience is paid to the kalari temple. Students apply tilak or tikka on their foreheads and upon the forehead of the idol of the presiding deity using soil from the ground of the kalari. The traditional training uniform used in Kalaripayattu is the kachakettal, a loincloth that is either red and white or red and black in colour. Along with traditional attire, oral commands, or vaithari, are given by the guru during training sessions, and are given in Sanskrit or Malayalam.

Historically, all Keralites of the Hindu community, men and women alike, would undergo mandatory training in Kalaripayattu beginning at the age of 7 or 9 and lasting until the end of their education. By the 11th century AD, members of other communities also began practicing the art. According to noted historian Professor A. Sreedharan Menon, "each desam or locality had a kalari with a guru at its head and both boys and girls received physical training in it." Warriors, soldiers and others who wanted to pursue a martial career would continue their training for the rest of their lives. Generally, two styles of Kalaripayattu are acknowledged among Kalari practitioners: the Northern Style and the Southern Style.  These two systems have marked similarities in their styles or vazhi ("way" or "method" in Malayalam), such as Hanuman Vazhi, Bhiman Vazhi, and Bali Vazhi among others. Each style, or vazhi, in Kalaripayattu has a different purpose. For instance, Hanuman Vazhi ("The Way of Hanuman" in Malayalam) is a style that places emphasis on speed and technical application, along with several techniques to trick or outwit an enemy. Bali Vazhi, ("The Way of Bali" in Malayalam) focuses on using the opponent's technical applications against them in such a way that it becomes dangerous to the opponent themselves. In Bhiman Vazhi ("The Way of Bhiman" in Malayalam), the usage of physical strength is predominant. The styles are variations that various masters have adapted and modified according to their understanding of the art. Development and mastery of Kalaripayattu comes from the tradition of constantly learning, adapting and improving the techniques by observing what techniques are practical and effective. While importance is placed on observation of tradition, Kalaripayattu gurukkuls have contributed to the evolution of Kalaripayattu by way of their experience and reasoning. A Kalari practitioner might encounter new fighting techniques from an enemy combatant. The Kalari practitioner would need to learn how to anticipate, adapt to and neutralize these new techniques. This is especially seen in the Southern style of Kalaripayattu, which is believed to have been adapted and modified during wars with Tamil kingdoms to counter martial arts like Silambam, which was one of the main martial art forms practiced by Tamil soldiers at the time.

Styles  
There are two major styles that are generally acknowledged within traditional Kalaripayattu, and are based on the regions in which they are practiced. They are the Northern style, or Vadakkan Kalari, and the Southern style, or Thekkan Kalari.

The northern style of Kalaripayattu, or Vadakkan Kalari, is primarily practiced in the Malabar region of Kerala, and is based on elegant and flexible movements, evasions, jumps and weapons training. The southern style of Kalaripayattu, or Thekkan Kalari, is primarily practiced in the southern regions of Kerala, and specializes in hard, impact based techniques with emphasis on hand-to-hand combat and pressure point strikes. Both systems make use of internal and external concepts.

A third style, the Central style, or Madhya Kalari, is also practiced, but it is less commonly practiced than its northern and southern counterparts.

A smaller, regional style of Kalaripayattu called Tulunadan Kalari, is referenced in texts such as the Vadakkan Pattukal, but it is largely restricted to the Tulu Nadu region in northern Kerala and southern Karnataka. Other smaller, regional styles are also said to exist in isolated regions of Kerala, but these styles are becoming increasingly rare, and difficult to find. Examples include Dronamballi, Odimurassery, Tulu Nadan Shaiva Mura, and Kayyangali.

Northern style  
The Northern style is also known as, Vadakkan Kalari, and is generally regarded as the "original," form of Kalaripayattu. This system places more emphasis on physical flexibility exercises rooted on the slogan Meyy kanavanam, meaning, "make the body an eye." These exercises are done individually, as well as in combinations. After that meypayattu (a concept similar to kata in Karate) is taught. These are a combination of flexibility exercises with offensive and defensive techniques, however, the actual techniques are taught very much later. Traditionally, the number of meypayattu may differ as per the teaching methods of the guru. Training is usually done in four stages, the first stage being Meipayattu (training stances), followed by Kolthari (practice with wooden weapons), Angathari (practice with metal weapons) and finally Verum kai (barehanded combat). Generally, the majority of the Kalaris (schools that teach Kalaripayattu) start training with weapons within 3 to 6 months. Some Kalaris only allow one weapon to be learned per year. After long stick and small stick fighting, iron weapons are introduced. Weapons training begins with the dagger and sword, followed by the spear. Not all modern schools use specialized weapons. Traditionally, bows and arrows were commonly used in Kerala and students were trained in these techniques, but is rarely taught today.

Kalaripayattu has three forms, which are distinguished by their attacking and defensive patterns. They are Arappa Kayy, Pilla Thangi, and Vatten Thiripp.

Southern style  
The Southern style is also known as Thekkan Kalari. Traditionally, it is believed to be a style of Kalaripayattu that is said to have been altered and influenced by Agastya. It is an essentially the northern style of Kalaripayattu that has been influenced by martial arts from neighboring regions, such as Varma Adi or Adi Murai. While the Southern form of Kalaripayattu has notable similarities to Varma Adi, it is considered to be a distinct and separate martial art from Varma Adi due to its similarities to Northern Kalaripayattu. The similarities between the southern form of Kalaripayattu and Varma Adi are likely due to geographic proximity to each other, with the Southern style of Kalaripayattu being considered a mixture of Kalaripayattu and Varma Adi. While the Southern style is less commonly practiced in Kerala compared to the Northern style, it is revered in Kerala as a combination of the teachings of both Parashurama and Agastya. It is predominantly practiced in some regions of the southern parts of Kerala, particularly in areas near Kanyakumari. While many of the exercises of the Southern style are identical to the Northern Style, it is more combative and martial in nature, and places heavy emphasis on hand-to-hand combat, hard impact techniques, and footwork, rather than emphasizing flexibility like the Northern style. It starts with the training in Chuvadu, a system of various combinations of fighting techniques similar to Muay Thai and Judo. Immediately after that, sparring with a partner is introduced as part of the training. These pre-determined techniques are repeatedly trained. After a basic proficiency in unarmed combat is established, weapons training begins with a small stick. Small stick training is usually done with two combatants, armed with a stick or dagger. These are primarily defensive techniques. Fighting techniques with two combatants having the same weapons include sparring with long stick, sword, etc. During the duration of this training, the refining of un-armed combat also progresses. As the student gains more experience, a small amount of knowledge pertaining to the Marma points (pressure points) is also taught to the student if deemed appropriate by the gurukkal.

Kalaripayattu techniques are a combination of steps (Chuvadu) and postures (Vadivu). Chuvadu literally means 'steps', the basic steps of the martial arts. Vadivu literally means 'postures' or stances which are the foundations of Kalaripayattu training. They are named after animals, and are usually presented in eight forms. Styles differ considerably from one tradition to another. Not only do the names of poses differ, but their utilization and interpretation vary depending on the gurukkal, and the traditions of the kalari. Each stance has its own style, combination, and function. These techniques vary from one style to another.

Marmashastram and massage 

It is claimed that experienced Kalari warriors could disable or kill their opponents by merely striking the correct marmam (vital point) on their opponent's body. This technique is taught only to the most promising and level-headed students so as to discourage misuse of the technique. Marmashastram stresses on the knowledge of marmam and is also used for marma treatment (marmachikitsa). This system of marma treatment originated from Ayurveda, as well as Siddha medicine. Critics of Kalaripayattu have pointed out that the application of marmam techniques against neutral outsiders has not always produced verifiable results.
 
The earliest mention of marmam is found in the Rig Veda, where Indra is said to have defeated Vritra by attacking his marmam with a vajra. References to marmam are also found in the Atharva Veda. With numerous other scattered references to vital points in Vedic and epic sources, it is certain that India's early martial artists knew about and practiced attacking or defending vital points. Sushruta (c. 6th century BC) identified and defined 107 vital points of the human body in his Sushruta Samhita. Of these 107 points, 64 were classified as being lethal if properly struck with a fist or stick. Sushruta's work formed the basis of the medical discipline Ayurveda, which was taught alongside various Indian martial arts that had an emphasis on vital points, such as Varma kalai and Marma adi.

As a result of learning about the human body, Indian martial artists became knowledgeable in the fields of traditional medicine and massage. Kalaripayattu teachers often provide massages (uzhichil) with medicinal oils to their students in order to increase their physical flexibility or to treat muscular injuries. Such massages are generally termed thirumal and the unique massage given to increase flexibility is known as katcha thirumal.

Governing bodies
In India, the Indian Kalaripayattu Federation (IKF) in Thiruvananthapuram is one of the primary governing bodies of Kalaripayattu. It is recognized by the Ministry of Youth Affairs and Sports of the Government of India. It received affiliation as a regional sports federation in 2015.

The Kalaripayattu Federation of India (KFI), based in Kozhikode, is another governing body of Kalaripayattu, as has been recognized by the Indian Olympic Association.

The Kerala Kalaripayattu Association (KKA) in Thiruvananthapuram is also a governing body of the martial art which is recognised by the Kerala State Sports Council.

Notable practitioners

Kottakkal Kanaran Gurukkal (1850-1935), the gurukkal of Chambadan Veetil Narayanan Nair. Korrakkal Kanaran Gurukkal is recognized as one of the gurukkals who preserved Kalaripayattu in Kerala and allowed it to survive into the twentieth century after studying it from several gurukkals in the Malabar region of the state.

Chambadan Veetil Narayanan Nair (1905-1944), a Kalaripayattu gurukkal and student of Kottakal Kanaran Gurukkal, who was popularly known as "CVN" and in whose memory the CVN Kalaris sprang up across Kerala, enabling the revival of Kalaripayattu across its native state.

Chirakkal T. Sreedharan Nair (1909-1984), a Kalaripayattu gurukkal, and founder of Sree Bharat Kalari (formerly known as Rajkumar Kalari). He is known for writing the first books on Kalaripayattu. His first work, Kalaripayattu, written in Malayalam and published in 1937, was the first book written on Kalaripayattu. He also authored first authoritative text and primer on Kalaripayattu, called Kalarippayattu – A Complete Guide to Kerala’s Ancient Martial Art. The text is considered to be the most authentic reference material on Kalaripayattu to this day.

For their contributions to the preservation of Kalaripayattu, Meenakshi Amma, a 73 year old gurukkal from Vadakara and Sankara Narayana Menon Chundayil, a gurukkal from Chavakkad, were awarded the Padma Sri by the Government of India.

In popular culture

In the Indian graphic novels Odayan and Odayan II – Yuddham, the title character is a vigilante who is highly skilled in Kalaripayattu, with the story itself being set in 16th century feudal Kerala.

Little Kalari Warriors, a cartoon made by Toonz Animation India for Cartoon Network, features Kalaripayattu practitioners as the principal characters. Kalaripayattu is also seen in the Indian animated film Arjun: The Warrior Prince (2012). In the Indian role-playing game Ashwathama — The Immortal, which is based on Indian mythology, the fight scenes were choreographed using Kalaripayattu, with the movements of the characters being motion captured from real Kalaripayattu masters.

Kalaripayattu is used as a fighting style for the character Connie Maheswaran in the American animated television series Steven Universe. Outside of Indian video games, characters in international games also use Kalaripayattu, such as Voldo in Soul Edge, Asura in Death Battle, and Zafina in the Tekken series among others. The style is also used by Cyril Rahman, Ethan Stanley and Shō Kanō in the Japanese manga TV series Kenichi: The Mightiest Disciple. In 2019, a character of Indian origin was introduced for the first time in the Japanese manga, Agari. It features a character named Ravi, a Kalaripayattu master, as the protagonist.

While numerous documentaries have been made about or referencing Kalaripayattu, one of the earliest known documentaries on the subject is a BBC documentary titled The Way of the Warrior. Kalaripayattu was also documented in Season 2 of Fight Quest.

In film 
Kalaripayattu has also featured in international and Indian films such as:

Thacholi Othenan (1964)
Aromalunni  (1972)
Ondanondu Kaladalli (Kannada) (1978)
Chilambu (1986)Oru Vadakkan Veeragatha  (1989)Kallan Kappalil Thanne (1991)Thacholi Varghese Chekavar (1995)Asoka (2001)The Myth (2005)The Last Legion (2007)Kerala Varma Pazhassi Raja (2009)Manasara (2010)
 Urumi (2011)
 Commando (2013)
 Bajirao Mastani (2015)
 Baaghi (2016)
 Veeram (2016)
 Padmaavat (2018)
 Kayamkulam Kochunni (2018)
 Junglee (2019)
 Athiran (2019)
 Pattas (2020)
 Sanak (2021)

 See also 

Meenakshi Amma
Angampora
Banshay
Bataireacht
Bōjutsu
Gatka
Adimurai
Indian martial arts
Kendo
Krabi–krabong
Kuttu Varisai
Mardani khel
Silambam
Tahtib
Thang-ta
Varma kalai
Ankam
Kalarippayattu films
Malayali

 References 

 Further reading 
 Balakrsnan, Pi (1995) Kalarippayattu: The ancient martial art of Kerala, C.V. Govindankutty Nair Gurukka 1995, ASIN B0006F9ONS
 Denaud, Patrick (1996) Kalaripayat, Budostore, 
 Elgood, Robert (2005) Hindu Arms and Ritual: Arms and Armour from India 1400-1865, Eburon Publishers, 
 Zarrilli, Phillip B. (1992) "To Heal and/or To Harm: The Vital Spots in Two South Indian Martial Traditions"
 Zarrilli, Phillip B. (1993) "Actualizing Power and Crafting a Self in Kalarippayattu", Journal of Asian Martial Arts''

External links 

 Kalaripayattu: The First Martial Art
 Kalarippayattu - one of the oldest martial arts, Government of Kerala website
(Wayback Machine copy)

Kalarippayattu
Indian martial arts
Dravidian martial arts
Culture of Kerala